The Cañon City Swastikas were a minor league baseball team based in Cañon City, Colorado, in 1912. Cañon City briefly played in the 1912 season as members of the Class D level Rocky Mountain League, before the Cañon City franchise relocated to Raton, New Mexico, during the season. Canon City hosted minor league home games at Centennial Park.

History
An early Cañon City based team called the "Cañon City Inter-Ocean Base Ball Club" played organized baseball, beginning in 1874.

The 1912 Cañon City Swastikas began minor league baseball play in Cañon City. Cañon City became charter members of the four–team Class D level Rocky Mountain League in 1912. The league started the season with the Colorado Springs Millionaires,  La Junta Railroaders and the Pueblo, Colorado, teams joining Cañon City in league play.

On June 4, 1912, the Cañon City franchise relocated to Raton, New Mexico. The team had a 5–6 record under manager Jack Farrell at the time they relocated to Raton.

The team's use of the "Swastikas" moniker has roots that are unknown. When the team franchise moved to New Mexico, they became the first minor league team based in New Mexico. Shortly after, the Colorado Springs Millionaires franchise moved to Dawson, New Mexico, and became the Dawson Stags.

The Rocky Mountain League permanently folded on July 5, 1912, before the completion of the scheduled season. At the time the league folded, the Cañon City/Raton team was in 2nd place with a 20–14 overall record. Cañon City/Raton finished 4.5 games behind the 1st place Pueblo/Cheyenne Indians team in the final league standings.

Since 1912, Cañon City, Colorado, has not hosted another minor league team.

Ballpark
Cañon City was noted to have hosted minor league home games at Centennial Park. Possibly having another name in 1912, Centennial Park is still in use today as a public park with ballfields. Centennial Park is located at 221 Griffin Avenue, Cañon City, Colorado.

Timeline

Year–by–year record

Players
Roster information for the 1912 Cañon City team is lacking in online baseball reference sites. An article in the Kansas City Times on May 23, 1912—the day before the start of the league's regular season—gave the team's roster as:
 Infielders: Albert Smith, Bill Kemmer, Maurice McKnight, Clifford Marr, and Hobson
 Outfielders: Mart Henry, Barrackman, George Henry
 Catcher: John Peters
 Pitchers: Art Hanna, Curtis, Wilder, and Littler

Bill Kemmer had played for the major-league Louisville Colonels in 1895, and John Peters later played for three major-league teams between 1915 and 1922.

Notes

References

External links
Baseball Reference

Defunct minor league baseball teams
Professional baseball teams in Colorado
Defunct baseball teams in Colorado
Baseball teams established in 1912
Baseball teams disestablished in 1912
Cañon City, Colorado
Fremont County, Colorado
Rocky Mountain League teams